Alessio Garofalo (born 10 March 1998) is an Italian football player who plays for Serie D club A.S.D.P. Ciliverghe di Mazzano.

Club career
He made his professional debut in the Serie B for Perugia on 4 March 2017 in a game against Avellino.

He returned to Paganese on 8 August 2018. On 9 January 2019, he was released from his contract by mutual consent.

On 24 August 2019, Garofalo joined Serie D club A.S.D.P. Ciliverghe di Mazzano.

References

External links
 

1998 births
Footballers from Rome
Living people
Italian footballers
A.C. Perugia Calcio players
Paganese Calcio 1926 players
Cavese 1919 players
Serie B players
Serie C players
Serie D players
Association football defenders